Varshets Municipality is a municipality (obshtina) in Montana Province, Northwestern Bulgaria, located on the northern slopes of the western Stara planina mountain to the area of the so-called Fore-Balkan. It is named after its administrative centre - the town of Varshets.

Todorini Kukli peak, is located in the southwestern part of the area almost on the very border with Berkovitsa Municipality.

Settlements 

Varshets Municipality includes the following 9 places (towns are shown in bold):

Demography 
The following table shows the change of the population during the last four decades.

Religion 
According to the latest Bulgarian census of 2011, the religious composition, among those who answered the optional question on religious identification, was the following:

See also
Provinces of Bulgaria
Municipalities of Bulgaria
List of cities and towns in Bulgaria

References

External links
 Official website 

Municipalities in Montana Province